Arvamusfestival ('The Opinion Festival') is an Estonian public festival whose mission is to enhance debate culture and civic education in the country. It takes place every year in August in Paide, Järva County. The first festival took place in 2013.

Arvamusfestival is inspired by Sweden festival called Almedalen Week.

Arvamusfestival is part of Democracy Festivals Association platform. This platform encompasses eight other discussion festivals.

References

External links

 

Festivals in Estonia
2013 establishments in Estonia